The Church Street Bridge is an historic road arch bridge over the Yarra River and the Monash Freeway in Melbourne, Victoria, Australia. It links Church Street in Richmond on the north bank with Chapel Street in South Yarra on the south.

History

The first bridge on the site was an iron girder bridge built in 1857. The bridge was dismantled and reconstructed with stone buttresses on the site.

The current bridge was designed by Harold Desbrowe Annear and opened in 1923, having three reinforced concrete arches supported by piled foundations. As originally constructed all three spans crossed the river, but with the construction of the South Eastern Arterial in the 1960s, the river was diverted away from under the northern span, and the four lane road was built there instead. This method of construction reduced the clearance available to traffic on the road underneath, and in the 1990s in conjunction with the CityLink project the arch elements of this span were removed, and replaced by new elements  higher at the crown and  higher at either end. Specialised monitoring was required during the process to manage the changing loads on the elements of the bridge.

In January 2007 rehabilitation work was carried out by VicRoads, including waterproofing the concrete deck, replacing the tram tracks, and general resurfacing. This required a total road and tramway closure. Further work commenced in April 2007 and involved replacement of balustrades and new traffic barriers at the kerbs.

The bridge is listed on the Victorian Heritage Register and is included in a Heritage Overlay. It is traversed by Melbourne tram route 78.

References

Bridges in Melbourne
Bridges over the Yarra River
Heritage-listed buildings in Melbourne
1923 establishments in Australia
Bridges completed in 1923
1857 establishments in Australia
Transport in the City of Yarra
Buildings and structures in the City of Yarra
Transport in the City of Stonnington
Buildings and structures in the City of Stonnington